The 2017 WNBA draft was the league's draft for the 2017 WNBA season. On March 30, the WNBA announced that the draft would take place on April 13 in New York at Samsung 837.

Draft lottery
The lottery selection to determine the order of the top four picks in the 2017 draft occurred on September 28, 2016. The winner of the lottery, the San Antonio Stars, picked first.

Lottery chances
All odds out of 1,000 based on percentages (the 11–12–13–14 combination is ignored).
San Antonio Stars (44.2%) – Won
Washington Mystics (10.4%)
Dallas Wings (22.7%)
Los Angeles Sparks (via Connecticut Sun) (22.7%)

This is the fourth time that the lottery was won by the team that had the highest odds. The lottery odds were based on combined records from the 2015 and 2016 WNBA seasons. The San Antonio Stars, with the worst two-year record, were guaranteed no worse than the third pick.

Key

Draft selections

Round 1

Round 2

Round 3

Notable prospects
On November 29, 2016, WNBA.com posted notable prospects for the draft. The list included: 
Alaina Coates – South Carolina 
Kelsey Plum – Washington 
Shatori Walker-Kimbrough – Maryland
Alexis Jones – Baylor
Nina Davis – Baylor
Nia Coffey – Northwestern
Brionna Jones – Maryland

On April 6, 2017, the WNBA released the names of the players who would be invited to be in attendance at the draft through their @WNBA Twitter account:
Brionna Jones, Maryland
Alexis Jones, Baylor
Allisha Gray, South Carolina
Kaela Davis, South Carolina
Nia Coffey, Northwestern
Alaina Coates, South Carolina
Erica McCall, Stanford
Kelsey Plum, Washington
Shatori Walker-Kimbrough, Maryland
Sydney Wiese, Oregon State

Post-draft day trades 
 Chicago Sky trade the draft rights of Chantel Osahor to the Minnesota Lynx for Keisha Hampton.

Footnotes

References

Women's National Basketball Association Draft
Draft
WNBA draft